Peeter Jakobson (23 November 1878 – ?) was an Estonian politician. He was a member of II Riigikogu. He was a member of the Riigikogu from 1 October 1924. He replaced Paul Tamm. On 14 September 1925, he was removed from his position and he was replaced by Mihkel Neps.

References

1878 births
Year of death missing
Workers' United Front politicians
Members of the Riigikogu, 1923–1926